The 2006 Minnesota's 6th congressional district election was an election for the United States House of Representatives. State senator Michele Bachmann of the Republican Party defeated child safety advocate Patty Wetterling of the Democratic-Farmer-Labor Party, and project co-ordinator John Binkowski of the Independence Party.

Republican convention

Received nomination
Michele Bachmann, state senator

Withdrew
Jay Esmay, businessman
Phil Krinkie, state representative
Jim Knoblach, state representative
Cheri Yecke, former Minnesota Commissioner of Education

Campaign
During the Republican convention, Bachmann and Krinkie both portrayed themselves as conservatives, while Knoblach emphasised his supposed electability.

Democratic convention

Received nomination
Patty Wetterling, children's safety advocate; mother of Jacob Wetterling

Withdrew
Scott Mortensen
Elwyn Tinklenberg, former Mayor of Blaine (endorsed Wetterling)

General election

Candidates
Michele Bachmann (Republican), state senator
Patty Wetterling (Democratic-Farmer-Labor), children's safety advocate; mother of Jacob Wetterling
John Binkowski (Independence), project coordinator for Johnson Controls

Campaign
Wetterling had previously run for the seat in 2004 against Mark Kennedy, and was widely regarded to have had a strong showing that year. Bachmann, who was considered a staunch conservative, had strong support from the conservative wing of the Republican Party. The resignation of Florida Republican Mark Foley after allegations that he sent sexually suggestive messages to underage congressional pages boosted Wetterling's campaign, as it highlighted an issue that she was very visible on. Wetterling also ran numerous ads about the scandal, claiming that the allegations proved that Republicans were not fit to control the house. Bachmann proceeded to accuse Wetterling of politicising child abuse, a claim that was criticised by Clara Jeffery, editor-in-chief of Mother Jones. The race broke Minnesota records for spending on a House of Representatives election, with a total of $4.6 million being spent.

Debates

Endorsements

Polls and ratings
The election was considered highly competitive, in early October, CQPolitics.com rated it as "No Clear Favorite".

Polling

Results

References

External links
Michele Bachmann for Congress- Official
Binkowski Campaign coverage by Minnesota Public Radio

Minnesota 6
2006 6
2006 Minnesota elections